Nicole “Nici” Schmidhofer (born 15 March 1989) is a former Austrian World Cup alpine ski racer. She specializes in the speed events of downhill and super-G.

Career
Born in Friesach in Carinthia, Schmidhofer made her World Cup debut in March 2007. She competed for Austria at the 2010 Winter Olympics, but did not finish in the super-G at Whistler, her only event at the Olympics. Three years later, Schmidhofer finished in 11th place in the super-G at the 2013 World Championships in Schladming.

At 2017 World Championships, she became surprise gold medalist in Super-G.

Her breakout World Cup season was in 2019, with three wins and three additional podiums; she won the season title in downhill and was runner-up in super-G.

In March 2019, she participates to her first speed skiing world championships in Vars (France). She finished 4th with a new Austria national record at 217,590 km/h.

World Cup results

Season standings
{| class=wikitable style="text-align:center"
!Season !! Age !! Overall !! Slalom !! Giantslalom !! Super-G !! Downhill !!Combined
|-
| 2007 || 17 || 104 || — || 57 || 41 || — || —  
|-
| 2008 ||18|| 124 || — || — || — || 51 || —  
|-
| 2009 ||19|| 70 || — || — || 26 || 40 || —  
|-
| 2010 ||20|| 81 || — || — || 28 || 49 || —
|-
| 2011 ||21|| 91 || — || — || 38 || 36 || —
|-
| 2012 ||22|| 86 || — || — || — || 35 || —
|-
| 2013 ||23|| 45 || — || — || 8 || 36 || —
|-
| 2014 ||24|| 20 || — || — || 12 || 11 || —
|-
| 2015 ||25|| 30 || — || — || 12 || 20 || —
|-
| 2016 ||26|| 49 || — || — || 23 || 21 || —
|-
| 2017 ||27|| 15 || — || — || 7 || 8 || —
|-
| 2018 ||28|| 17 || — || — || 7 || 9 || —
|-
| 2019 ||29|| 5 || — || — || bgcolor="silver"|2 || bgcolor="gold"|1 || —
|-
| 2020 ||30|| 13 || — || — ||style="background:#c96;"|3 || 9 || — 
|-
| 2021 ||31|| colspan=6|
|-
| 2022 ||32||109||— ||—||45||— || rowspan=2 
|-
| 2023 ||33||53||—||—||11||35|}

Race podiums
4 wins – (3 DH, 1 SG) 
12 podiums – 6 DH, 6 SG) 

World Championship results

Olympic results

References

External links

Nicole Schmidhofer at Austrian Ski team (ÖSV) Nicole Schmidhofer at Fischer Skis
nici-schmidhofer.at personal site ''

1989 births
Austrian female alpine skiers
Alpine skiers at the 2010 Winter Olympics
Alpine skiers at the 2014 Winter Olympics
Alpine skiers at the 2018 Winter Olympics
Olympic alpine skiers of Austria
People from Friesach
Living people
Sportspeople from Carinthia (state)
20th-century Austrian women
21st-century Austrian women